It's a Miserable Life may refer to:

Television 
 "It's a Miserable Life (The Golden Girls)", an episode of the sitcom The Golden Girls
 "It's a Miserable Life (Beavis and Butt-head)", an episode of the animated series Beavis and Butt-head
 "It's a Miserable Life (One on One)", an episode of the sitcom One on One
 "It's a Miserable Life (Freddy's Nightmares)", an episode of the horror series Freddy's Nightmares

Other uses 
 It's a Miserable Life, a novel based on the television adaptation of Sabrina the Teenage Witch by Cathy East Dubowski

See also 
 It's a Wonderful Life (disambiguation)